Mikamycins are a group of macrolide antibiotics.
Mikamycin can refer to:
 Mikamycin A
 Mikamycin B